Ridge is an unincorporated community in Robertson County, Texas, United States.  It lies at an elevation of 358 feet (109 m), and it is located at 
 (31.1454605, -96.3219099). Ridge is located along U.S. Route 79 and a Missouri Pacific Railroad line.

Ridge is part of the Bryan–College Station Metropolitan Statistical Area. Ridge's ZIP Code is 77856.

Ridge was formed in the 1850s under the name Holly Springs as a community for nearby cotton farmers. In 1916, the Missouri Pacific Railroad placed a switch known as Ridge in the community, and the community became known as Ridge. Ridge's post office opened in 1926; the first postmaster was Robert Reeves.

References

Unincorporated communities in Robertson County, Texas
Unincorporated communities in Texas
Bryan–College Station